James Masson,  (February 17, 1847 – December 24, 1903) was a lawyer and political figure in Ontario. He represented Grey North in the House of Commons of Canada from 1887 to 1896 as a Conservative member.

He was born in Seymour Township, Canada West, the son of Thomas W.S. Masson, and educated there and in Belleville. Masson articled in law with William Hamilton Ponton, was called to the Ontario bar in 1871 and set up practice in Owen Sound. In 1878, he married Jessie Morrison. Masson served as Master in Chancery at Owen Sound from 1873 to 1885. He was first elected to the House of Commons in the 1887 federal election, defeating the incumbent Benjamin Allen, and was reelected in 1891. He was named Queen's Counsel in 1885.

References 

The Canadian parliamentary companion, 1891 AJ Gemmill

1847 births
1903 deaths
Members of the House of Commons of Canada from Ontario
Conservative Party of Canada (1867–1942) MPs
Masters in chancery
Canadian King's Counsel